Paul Marsh (born 5 December 1939) is a South African former first-class cricketer.

Marsh was born at Johannesburg. He studied in England at the University of Cambridge, attending Jesus College. While studying at Cambridge, Marsh made a single appearance in first-class cricket for Cambridge University against Middlesex at Fenner's in 1965. Batting twice in the match, he was dismissed for 2 runs in the Cambridge first-innings by Don Bennett, while in their second-innings he was dismissed for 23 runs by Fred Titmus. He also bowled seven wicketless overs with his right-arm off break bowling across the match. In addition to playing first-class cricket, Marsh also played minor counties cricket for Cambridgeshire in 1965, making five appearances in the Minor Counties Championship.

References

External links

1939 births
Living people
People from Johannesburg
Alumni of Christ's College, Cambridge
South African cricketers
Cambridge University cricketers
Cambridgeshire cricketers